Alfredo Salazar Southwell (1913 – 14 September 1937) was a Peruvian aviator, celebrated as a national hero.

Biography
Salazar was born in 1913 (exact date uncertain) to an established family in Lima.  In 1920, he entered the Anglo-Peruvian School.  Graduating with high marks, he entered the School of Engineers in 1931.

The next year, he presented himself to the Peruvian Air Force to study as a cadet.  He finished his military studies in 1935, assuming the rank of Sub-Ensign, and was assigned the post of flight instructor for cadets.  In 1936, he was promoted to the rank of Flight Officer.

Death
On the morning of 14 September 1937, during a rehearsal for an airshow celebrating the inauguration of a monument to Jorge Chávez, the airplane he was piloting started emitting smoke.

On seeing this, Salazar ordered his copilot, a mechanical technician surnamed Fajardo, to parachute to safety.  Fajardo initially protested, but followed orders.

Salazar then purposely piloted away from urban areas.  The plane crashed in a field in the seaside district of Miraflores, killing Southwell.  The field was dedicated as a park in his memory, and a monument honoring him was erected there in 1953.

See also
Colegio San Andrés

1913 births
1937 deaths
Peruvian Air Force personnel
Peruvian people of English descent
Peruvian people of Spanish descent
Aviators killed in aviation accidents or incidents
Victims of aviation accidents or incidents in 1937
Victims of aviation accidents or incidents in Peru